James Richard Jones was a Virginia state legislator as well as a postmaster and a member of the Capitol police.

He first served in the legislature in the Virginia Senate from November 1876 to 1877 taking over mid-term to fill the vacated seat after the death of Albert P. Lathrop. He ran for the next session as a Radical in 1877 but lost to a white conservative E. B. Goode by 373 votes.

In August 1880 he started work by appointment as postmaster for Boydton a position he held until January 12, 1885.

During this same period he ran again for the senate as a member of the Readjuster Party and won to serve the term from 1881 for four years. Jones introduced two bills to abolish the Whipping post and to remove that slavery legacy from the state. Jones did not serve his full term and resigned on December 1, 1883 part way though his term. He was one of four senators found to have flaunted the constitution and laws by being elected whilst holding a salaried office under the State Government.

He then ran for representative in 1885 winning by defeating the democrat Charles L. Finch and so serving in the Virginia House of Delegates representing Mecklenburg County, Virginia from 1885 to 1887 as a Republican. He then failed to gain the Republican nomination for the next term in 1887.

Jones was charged in December 1885 with stealing a registered letter whilst he was the Boydton postmaster in 1883. He was tried, April 13, 1886, at the federal court in Richmond on charges of mail tampering resulting in a hung jury, and then was acquitted in a re-trial later in October.

By December 1888 he had moved to Washington, D.C. where he joined the Capitol police force.

See also
 African-American officeholders during and following the Reconstruction era

References

Virginia state senators
Members of the Virginia House of Delegates
Virginia postmasters
Readjuster Party politicians
United States Capitol Police officers
Date of birth unknown
Date of death unknown